English Heritage (officially the English Heritage Trust) is a registered charity that looks after the National Heritage Collection. English Heritage is steward of over 400 significant historical and archaeological sites. It has direct ownership over some historic sites and also liaises with private owners of sites that are managed under guardianship arrangements. In Somerset there are twelve sites, ranging from Neolithic sites such as Stanton Drew stone circles and Stoney Littleton Long Barrow through medieval castles and religious sites such as Farleigh Hungerford Castle and Cleeve Abbey to the most recent, Sir Bevil Grenville's Monument, which was erected in 1720.

Somerset consists of a non-metropolitan county, administered by Somerset County Council, which is divided into five districts, and two unitary authorities. The districts of Somerset are West Somerset, South Somerset, Taunton Deane, Mendip and Sedgemoor. North Somerset and Bath and North East Somerset historically came under Somerset County Council. In 1974 they became part of county of Avon, and in 1996 they became administratively independent when Avon was broken up into unitary authorities.

Many of the buildings included in the list are listed buildings or scheduled monuments. Listed status refers to a building or other structure officially designated as being of special architectural, historical, or cultural significance; Grade I structures are those considered to be "buildings of exceptional interest". Listing was begun by a provision in the Town and Country Planning Act 1947. A scheduled monument is a "nationally important" archaeological site or historic building, given protection against unauthorised change. Scheduled monuments are specified in the Ancient Monuments and Archaeological Areas Act 1979, which defines a monument as:

Properties

See also
 List of English Heritage properties
 List of National Trust properties in Somerset

References

English Heritage
Lists of buildings and structures in Somerset